Verdie is an unincorporated community in Nassau County, Florida, United States. It is located on US 301, in the southwestern part of the county.

Geography
Verdie is located at  (30.435, -81.9214) between the communities of Ingle and Crawford.
The elevation of Verdie is 69 ft. above sea level.

References

Unincorporated communities in Nassau County, Florida
Unincorporated communities in the Jacksonville metropolitan area
Unincorporated communities in Florida